John Gill Valentine (November 21, 1855 – October 10, 1903) was an American pitcher and umpire in Major League Baseball who played one season as a player for the  Columbus Buckeyes of the American Association, and later umpired from  to .

Playing career
Born in Brooklyn, New York, he made his major league debut for the Buckeyes in 1883, his only season as a player, and compiled 13 games pitched, starting 12 and completing 11 of them. He had a win-loss record of 2–10, with an earned run average of 3.53 in 102 innings pitched.

Umpiring career
After the 1883 season, Valentine became an umpire, beginning in 1884 for the American Association, and umpiring 102 games that first season. He continued umpiring in the Association until midway through the  season, when switched over to the National League, which is where he continued to umpire until retiring after the 1888 season.

Valentine was involved in a couple of notable games, including being behind the plate for two no-hitters. The first game came on May 29, 1884, when Ed Morris of the Columbus Buckeyes blanked the Pittsburgh Alleghenys; and the other came just seven days later on June 5, when Frank Mountain, also of the Buckeyes, no-hit the Washington Nationals.

Death
Valentine died at the age of 47 in Central Islip, New York, and is interred at Green-Wood Cemetery in Brooklyn.

References

External links

Retrosheet – career umpiring record

1855 births
1903 deaths
Major League Baseball pitchers
19th-century baseball players
Columbus Buckeyes players
Sportspeople from Brooklyn
Baseball players from New York City
Burials at Green-Wood Cemetery
Major League Baseball umpires
Winona Clipper players
Holyoke (minor league baseball) players
Brooklyn Atlantics (minor league) players
Trenton (minor league baseball) players
People from Central Islip, New York